Hardin County Courthouse may refer to:
 Hardin County Courthouse (Illinois)
 Hardin County Courthouse (Iowa), listed on the National Register of Historic Places (NRHP)
 Hardin County Courthouse (Kentucky)
 Hardin County Courthouse (Ohio), NRHP-listed
 Hardin County Courthouse (Texas)